Gemma Rovira Ortega (born in 1974) is an English-Spanish translator from Barcelona, known for translating the Harry Potter series, The Boy in the Striped Pyjamas by John Boyne and The Kingkiller Chronicle series by Patrick Rothfuss into Spanish.

Biography 
She studied Spanish Philology at the 'Universidad Central de Barcelona' when a Faculty for Translation Studies did not exist yet. At that time she still did not know what she wanted to do for a living. She also studied English at the British Institute of Barcelona where she obtained the Certificate of Proficiency in English from the University of Cambridge.

Career 
Since 1988 she has been exclusively dedicated to the English-Spanish translation. She has worked with different publishing houses: Anagrama, Minotauro, Random House or Salamandra. Ms Rovira began translating the Harry Potter series in 2004, her first translation being that of Harry Potter and the Order of the Phoenix. She has also translated books by Anne Tyler and The boy in the Stripped Pyjamas by John Boyne, a best seller book in Spain in 2007 and 2008.

She is also a member of APTIC (Professional Association of Translators and Interpreters of Catalonia) and of ACE Translators (Autonomous Section of Translators of the Spanish Association of Writers) between 2006 and 2010.

Translated books 
Harry Potter series by J.K. Rowling
Harry Potter and the Order of the Phoenix
Harry Potter and the Half-Blood Prince
Harry Potter and the Deathly Hallows
Fantastic Beasts and Where to Find Them
Quidditch Through the Ages
The Tales of Beedle the Bard
The Kingkiller Chronicle by Patrick Rothfuss   
The Name of the Wind
The Wise Man's Fear
"The Slow Regard of Silent Things"
Other books (partial list):
The Piano Tuner by Daniel Mason
Snow Flower and the Secret Fan by Lisa See
The Penelopiad by Margaret Atwood
A Short History of Myth by Karen Armstrong
Oxygen by Andrew Miller
The Amateur Marriage by Anne Tyler
The Secret History by Donna Tartt

References

1974 births
Translators to Spanish
Living people